The steam locomotives of DR Class 22 were reconstructed passenger train locomotives in service with the Deutsche Reichsbahn in East Germany after the Second World War.

These engines were rebuilt from DRG Class 39.0-2 locomotives and appeared between 1958 and 1962 as part of the reconstruction programme. The latter had a significant problem: the boiler did not generate enough steam and the steam pipes were too winding, which considerably reduced the maximum power of the engine. A total of 85 examples were equipped with a new combustion-chambered boiler with an IfS mixer-preheater. The locomotive frame had to be extended to accommodate the new engine. The wider outer firebox meant that the driver's cab needed a modified rear wall. The locomotives were given operating numbers 22 001–085 and were mainly homed in the Reichsbahn divisions of Dresden and Erfurt.

The DR employed the locomotives on heavy express train duties in the schedules for the DRG Class 01, which led to overloading of the original components (frame cracks, piston damage). As a result, early retirement followed.
In 1968, 50 of the 85 Reko boilers from the Class 22 were used for the reconstruction of the DRG Class 03.

In 1970 the engines were allocated to Class 39 under the DR's new computerised numbering scheme. However, in 1970 only a few machines were still working, at Halberstadt and Saalfeld. In 1971 the last one was withdrawn. Up to the early 1990s, nine engines were used as steam generators.

The vehicles were equipped with 2'2' T 32 or 2'2' T 34 tenders.

See also 
 List of East German Deutsche Reichsbahn locomotives and railbuses
 Rekolok
 List of preserved steam locomotives in Germany

References

External links 
 Bilder und Daten historischer Loks

22
2-8-2 locomotives
22
Railway locomotives introduced in 1958
Passenger locomotives
Standard gauge locomotives of Germany
1′D1′ h3 locomotives